The Agaricostilbomycetes are a class of fungi in the subdivision Pucciniomycotina of the Basidiomycota. The class consists of a single order, six families, and 15 genera. Most species are known only from their yeast states. Where known, basidiocarps (fruitbodies) are typically small and stilboid (pin-shaped).

References

External  links

Basidiomycota classes
Pucciniomycotina